The Electronic Entertainment Experience 2021 (E3 2021) was the 26th E3, during which hardware manufacturers, software developers, and publishers from the video game industry presented new and upcoming products. The event, organized by the Entertainment Software Association (ESA), ran as a virtual, online-only event with free access to all, from June 12–15, 2021.

Virtual events included keynote sessions from major publishers broadcast from a live stage in Los Angeles, an awards show, and a preview night, as well as helping companies to hold online private meetings with media and businesses. Because of the online-only nature, the event had been rebranded for the year as the Electronic Entertainment Experience rather than the standard Electronic Entertainment Expo. Greg Miller, Jacki Jing, and Alex "Goldenboy" Mendez served as hosts of the virtual events.

E3 2021 followed the cancelled E3 2020 event due to the COVID-19 pandemic and after the ESA could not work out a replacement event in time. The ESA had intended to hold an in person event in 2021 during its normal June dates, as stated to partners in April 2020, but had to alter their plans due to ongoing COVID-19 concerns. E3 2021 was free for everyone to attend. While the 2021 event was entirely online, ESA planned to return to an in-person event by 2022, though these plans were scrapped and the in-person event was cancelled in January 2022, and E3 2022 was cancelled altogether on March 31, 2022, including the digital event. Finally, in July 2022, it was confirmed that E3 2023 would mark a return to the in-person event.

Companies that participated at the event included Nintendo, Microsoft, Capcom, Ubisoft, Take-Two Interactive, Warner Bros. Interactive Entertainment, Koch Media, Square Enix, Sega, Gearbox Software, Bandai Namco Entertainment, Turtle Beach, Verizon, and Xseed Games. Konami had planned to participate but announced later they would not be ready to present at E3 as they were deep into development on several projects which they would reveal at a later time.

Online events
To host the online event, the ESA offered a mobile app and online portal to the public. Members of the media and press had access to this app and portal on June 7, for a media access week prior to the event. The public obtained access on June 12. The app and portal were used for accessing game showcases, developer panels, and press conferences, with some of this content also mirrored onto streaming services. Members of the media were able to register for access starting on May 24, while industry professionals and creators and influencers were able to register on May 31. General members of the public were able to register on June 3.

Press conferences

Ubisoft
Ubisoft livestreamed its Ubisoft Forward E3 video event on June 12, 2021 at 12 p.m. PDT. Games covered during the event included Tom Clancy's Rainbow Six Extraction, Rocksmith+, Riders Republic, Tom Clancy's Rainbow Six: Siege, Assassin's Creed: Valhalla, Just Dance 2022, Far Cry 6, Mario + Rabbids Sparks of Hope, and Avatar: Frontiers of Pandora.

Gearbox Software
Gearbox Software held its E3 spotlight on June 12, 2021 at 2 p.m. PDT., providing more info on Tiny Tina's Wonderlands, Godfall, Homeworld 3, Tribes of Midgard and a look at the Borderlands film.

Microsoft/Bethesda
Microsoft and Bethesda Softworks held a joint press conference on June 13, 2021 at 10 a.m. PDT. Games presented included  Starfield, S.T.A.L.K.E.R. 2, Back 4 Blood, Contraband, Sea of Thieves, Battlefield 2042, 12 Minutes, Psychonauts 2, Fallout 76, The Elder Scrolls  Online, Party Animals, Hades, Somerville, Halo Infinite, Diablo II Resurrected, A Plague's Tale: Requiem, Far Cry 6, Slime Rancher 2, Atomic Heart, Replaced, Grounded, Among Us, Eiyuden Chronicle: Hundred Heroes, The Ascent, The Outer Worlds 2, Microsoft Flight Simulator, Forza Horizon 5 and Redfall.

Square Enix
Square Enix held a press event on June 13, 2021 at 12:15 p.m. PDT. Games announced included Marvel's Guardians of the Galaxy, remasters of Final Fantasy I through Final Fantasy VI, Legend of Mana, Marvel's Avengers, Babylon's Fall, Life Is Strange Remastered Collection, Life Is Strange: True Colors, and Stranger of Paradise: Final Fantasy Origin.

PC Gaming Show
PC Gamer presented its PC Gaming Show event on June 13, 2021 at 2:30 p.m. PDT. Among games featured included:

 Arboria
 Chernobylite
 Citizen Sleeper
 Dodgeball Academia
 Dying Light 2: Stay Human
 Far: Changing Tides
 Gigabash
 Gloomwood
 Icarus
 Ixion
 Lakeburg Legacies
 Lemnis Gate
 Mechajammer
 Naraka: Bladepoint
 Next Space Rebels
 Orcs Must Die 3
 Project Warlock 2
 Rawmen
 Sacrifire
 Silt
 Songs of Conquest
 Soulstice
 They Always Run
 Tinykin
 Vampire: The Masquerade - Swansong
 WarTales

Capcom
Capcom's E3 presentation was given on June 14, 2021 at 2:30 p.m. PDT.  Games presented included Resident Evil Village, Resident Evil RE:Verse, Monster Hunter Stories 2: Wings of Ruin, Monster Hunter Rise, The Great Ace Attorney Chronicles, and Street Fighter V.

Nintendo
Nintendo held a Nintendo Direct for E3 on the final day of the convention, June 15, 2021 at 9 a.m. PDT, followed by a three-hour-long Nintendo Treehouse Live show about titles discussed in the Nintendo Direct. Games included Super Smash Bros. Ultimate, Life Is Strange, Life Is Strange: True Colors, Marvel's Guardians of the Galaxy,  Worms Rumble, Astria Ascending, Two Point Campus, Super Monkey Ball: Banana Mania, Mario Party Superstars, Metroid Dread, Just Dance 2022, Cruis'n Blast, Dragon Ball Z: Kakarot, Mario Golf: Super Rush, Monster Hunter Stories 2: Wings of Ruin, WarioWare: Get It Together!, Shin Megami Tensei V, Danganronpa Decadance, Fatal Frame: Maiden of Black Water, Mario + Rabbids Sparks of Hope, Advance Wars 1+2: Re-Boot Camp, Hyrule Warriors: Age of Calamity, The Legend of Zelda: Skyward Sword HD, and the sequel to The Legend of Zelda: Breath of the Wild. Nintendo also announced a limited edition Game & Watch for the Zelda series for its 35th anniversary that included the original Zelda game, Zelda II: The Adventure of Link, and Link's Awakening.

Best of E3 Awards
Editors from IGN, GameSpot, PC Gamer, and GamesRadar+ collectively decided on the Best of E3 Awards on June 15, 2021. Among their picks, Forza Horizon 5 was named as the Most Anticipated Game overall, with the Microsoft and Bethesda event as the Best Presentation.

Featured games 
This is a list of notable titles that appeared by their developers or publishers at E3 2021.

Other events

Guerrilla Collective 
The Guerrilla Collective, a group of indie game developers and publishers, held a two-day showcase of new game announcements over June 5 and June 12, 2021.

Games announced during the two-day event included:

 Aeon Drive 
 AK-xolotl 
 Akatori 
 Among Us 
 ANNO: Mutationem 
 Aragami 2 
 Arcade Paradise 
 Archvale 
 Arietta of Spirits 
 Batora: Lost Haven 
 Bats the Game 
 Beasts of Maravilla Island 
 Behind the Frame 
 Black Book 
 Bloodstained: Ritual of the Night 
 Blooming Business: Casino 
 BPM: Bullets Per Minute 
 Chernobylite 
 Death Trash 
 Demon's Mirror 
 Demon Turf 
 Despot's Game 
 El Paso, Elsewhere 
 Elderand 
 Endling 
 The Eternal Cylinder 
 Fire Tonight 
 Firegirl 
 Ghostrunner 
 Grime 
 Grow: Song of the Evertree 
 Guild of Dungeoneering: Ultimate Edition 
 Happy's Humble Burger Farm 
 Hello Neighbor 2 
 Hunt the Night 
 Industria 
 King of the Hat 
 Kitsune Tails 
 Kraken Academy 
 KungFu Kickball 
 Lamentum 
 Legend of Keepers: Return of the Goddess 
 The Legend of TianDing 
 The Light of The Darkness 
 The Lightbringer 
 Loot River
 Moroi 
 My Lovely Wife 
 Neverwinter 
 No Longer Home 
 Omno 
 Onsen Master 
 Potion Craft: Alchemist Simulator 
 Raji: An Ancient Epic 
 Rawmen: Food Fighter Arena 
 Robodunk 
 Rubi: The Wayward Mira 
 Run Die Run Again 
 Sable
 Serial Cleaners 
 Severed Steel 
 Slime Heroes 
 Source of Madness 
 Super Space Club 
 Tamarindos Freaking Dinner 
 Tinkertown 
 Trash Sailors 
 Trifox 
 Ultra Age 
 UnMetal 
 Venice 2089 
 Vertigo 
 White Shadows 
 Wolfstride 
 Ynglet 
 Zodiac Legion

Summer Game Fest
Geoff Keighley's second Summer Game Fest kicked off around the same time as E3 2021 and will last two months, through Gamescom in August 2021, featuring a range of promotional events outside of E3. Though Keighley had already stepped away from participating in E3 2020 before its cancellation, he arranged the first Summer Game Fest as a replacement for the cancelled show. Sony and the PlayStation brand had announcements during this event, forgoing E3 as they have done so from previous years, instead opting to do a dedicated State of Play event for the summer on July 8, 2021. Announcements made during the event include:

 Arcadegeddon
 Deathloop
 Death Stranding: Director's Cut
 Demon Slayer -Kimetsu no Yaiba- The Hinokami Chronicles
 F.I.S.T.
 Hunter's Arena: Legends
 Jett: The Far Shore
 Lost Judgment
 Moss: Book II
 Sifu
 Tribes of Midgard

From June 15–21, 2021, ID@Xbox offered a number of demos of upcoming games on the Xbox platform as part of the Summer Game Fest.

The Summer Game Fest opened with an announcement stream of games hosted by Keighley on June 10, 2021. Among titles presented include:

 Among Us
 The Anacrusis
 Back 4 Blood
 Call of Duty: Warzone
 The Dark Pictures Anthology: House of Ashes
 Death Stranding Director's Cut 
 Elden Ring
 Escape from Tarkov
 Evil Dead: The Game
 Fall Guys
 Jurassic World Evolution 2
 Lost Ark
 Metal Slug Tactics
 Monster Hunter Stories 2: Wings of Ruin 
 Overwatch 2
 Planet of Lana
 Salt and Sacrifice
 Solar Ash
 Tales of Arise
 Tiny Tina's Wonderlands 
 Two Point Campus
 Valorant
 Vampire: The Masquerade - Bloodhunt

The Summer Game Fest included the first Tribeca Games Spotlight on June 11, 2021, featuring games that had been nominated for the inaugural Tribeca Film Festival Video Game award. These games included:

 The Big Con
 Harold Halibut
 Kena: Bridge of Spirits
 Lost in Random
 NORCO
 Sable
 SIGNALIS
 12 Minutes

Koch Media presented a showcase on June 11, 2021 at 12 p.m. PDT., as part of the Summer Game Fest. Alongside introducing their new publishing label, Prime Matter, Koch Media's presenting covered the following games:

 The Chant
 Codename Final Form
 Crossfire: Legion
 Dolman
 Echoes of the End
 Encased
 Gungrave G.O.R.E.
 King's Bounty 2
 The Last Oricru
 Painkiller 2
 Payday 3
 Scars Above

IGN Expo 
IGN held its IGN Expo event on June 11, 2021, at 1 p.m. PDT. Among featured games included:

 Arboria
 AudioClash: Battle of the Bands
 Big Rumble Boxing: Creed Champions
 Black Skylands
 Bramble: The Mountain King
 Broken Pieces
 Blacktail
 Chernobylite
 Core Keeper
 Death's Gambit: Afterlife
 Disciples: Liberation
 Doki Doki Literature Club Plus!
 The Forgotten City
 Haunted Space
 Inkulinati
 Martha Is Dead
 Mortal Shell
 OlliOlli World
 Sherlock Holmes: Chapter One
 Sifu
 SkateBird
 Smite
 Splitgate
 Steelrising
 Streets of Rage 4
 Survival Machine
 Tiny Tina's Wonderlands
 Two Point Campus
 Unbound: Worlds Apart
 Unpacking
 Wild West Dynasty
 World War Z: Aftermath

Wholesome Games 
Wholesome Games held its Wholesome Direct event on June 12, 2021 at 10 a.m. PDT. It featured over 75 indie titles from small developers around the world.

 Alekon
 Amber Isle
 APICO
 BattleCakes
 Bear & Breakfast
 Beasts of Maravilla Island
 Behind the Frame
 Bird Problems
 Book of Travels
 Button City
 Cat Cafe Manager
 Cat Designer Mocha
 Clawfish
 Cloud Jumper
 co-open
 Dordogne
 Dreamland Confectionery
 Fire Tonight
 Floppy Knights
 Fossil Corner
 Freshly Frosted
 Frogsong
 Game Director Story
 The Garden Path
 Garden Story
 The Gecko Gods
 Here Comes Niko
 Hoa
 Hot Pot for One
 KeyWe
 Kokopa's Atlas
 Kotodama Diary
 KreatureKind
 Lake
 Lego Builder's Journey
 Letters: A Written Adventure
 A Little to the Left
 Loddlenaut
 Lonefarm
 Luna's Fishing Garden
 The Magnificent Trufflepigs
 Moonglow Bay
 Moonshell Island
 Mythic Ocean
 Ooblets
 The Outbound Ghost
 ParaLives
 Passpartout 2: The Lost Artist
 Pekoe
 Please Be Happy
 PowerWash Simulator
 Princess Farmer
 Pupperazzi
 Rainbow Billy: The Curse of the Leviathan
 Recolit
 RoboCo
 Sally
 Seasonspree
 Shashingo
 SkateBIRD
 Snacko
 Soup Pot
 Spirit Swap
 Tasomachi: Behind the Twilight
 Teacup
 Toodee and Topdee
 Tracks of Thought
 Unpacking
 Venba
 A Walk With Yiayia
 We Are OFK
 Witchery Academy
 Witchy Life Story
 Woodo
 Wytchwood
 Yokai Inn

Devolver Digital
Devolver Digital held its presentation on June 12, 2021 at 1:30 p.m. PT. Games presented included Shadow Warrior 3, Trek to Yomi, Phantom Abyss, Wizard With a Gun, Death's Door, Inscryption, Devolver Tumble Time, and Demon Throttle. As with its recent presentations, the Devolver Digital continued to use the humor based on the character of Nina Struthers, this time presenting their new games as part of a new monetization scheme, the "Devolver MaxPass+".

UploadVR Showcase
UploadVR held a presentation focusing on virtual reality games on June 12, 2021. Among games featured in this presentation included:

 After the Fall
 Blaston
 Demeo
 Fracked
 Green Hell
 I Expect You to Die 2: The Spy and the Liar
 In Da Hoop
 Larcenauts
 Nerf Ultimate Championship
 Pistol Whip
 Rhythm of the Universe: Ionia
 Sam and Max: This Time it's Virtual
 Sniper Elite VR
 Song in the Smoke
 A Township Tale
 Traffic Jams
 Unplugged
 Waltz of the Wizard

Limited Run Games 
Limited Run Games held its annual #LRG3 event on June 14, 2021, at 1 p.m. PDT. It featured over 25 new announcements for games being published physically, including the 3DO game Plumbers Don't Wear Ties.

Future Games Show 
GamesRadar+ hosted its second Future Games Show on June 14, 2021 with hosts Troy Baker and Laura Bailey. Games featured during the presentation included:

 Batora Lost Haven
 Chernobylite
 Conway: Disappearance at Dahlia View
 DeathRun TV
 Dying Light 2: Stay Human
 Eldest Souls
 Enlisted
 Esports Boxing Club
 Grow: Song of the Evertree
 Get Packed: Fully Loaded
 Happy Game
 Harold Halibut
 Hell Let Loose
 Immortality
 Instinction
 Jurassic World Evolution 2
 Keywe
 Lake
 Minute of Islands
 OlliOlli World
 Project Ferocious
 Red Solstice 2: Survivors
 Severed Steel
 Sonic Colors Ultimate
 Starmancer
 Tails of Iron
 Two Point Campus
 Warcry Challenges

Hooded Horse held its presentation on June 14, 2021. Games featured during the presentation included:

 Alliance of the Sacred Suns
 Falling Frontier
 Terra Invicta

Freedom Games Showcase
Freedom Games held its first event on June 15, 2021. Games featured during the presentation included:

 Airborne Kingdom
 Anuchard
 Cat Cafe Manager
 Coromon
 Dark Deity
 Dreamscaper
 Monster Outbreak
 One Lonely Outpost
 Sands of Aura
 Slaughter League
 To The Rescue!
 Tower Rush

Yooreka Studio
Yooreka Studio held its presentation on June 15, 2021. Games featured during the presentation included:

 Extremely Realistic Siege Warfare Simulator
 The Immortal Mayor
 Loopmancer
 Metal Mind
 Mohism
 Reshaping Mars
 The Swordsmen X: Survival
 Tales of Wild

New Blood Interactive
New Blood Interactive held its presentation on June 16, 2021. Games featured during the presentation included:

 Amid Evil
 Dusk 82
 Faith: The Unholy Trinity
 Fallen Aces
 Gloomwood
 Ultrakill
 Unfortunate Spacemen

Steam Next Fest
From June 16–22, 2021, Valve ran its Steam Next Fest, a rebranding of its prior Steam Game Festival which it first ran in 2019. During the event, Valve had hundreds of game demos available via the Steam platform along with livestreams with developers and selected game sales.

EA Play
Electronic Arts had its separate EA Play event on July 22, 2021. Games shown off in the event included:

 Apex Legends
 Battlefield 2042
 Battlefield: Portal
 Dead Space (Remake)
 FIFA 22
 Grid Legends
 Knockout City
 Lost in Random
 Madden NFL 22
 The Sims 4

Annapurna Interactive Showcase
Annapurna Interactive held its first event on July 29, 2021. Games shown off in the event included:

 The Artful Escape
 Gorogoa
 I Am Dead
 A Memoir Blue
 Neon White
 Outer Wilds: Echoes of the Eye
 The Pathless
 Skin Deep
 Solar Ash
 Storyteller
 Stray
 Telling Lies
 What Remains of Edith Finch

Future of Play Direct 
GLITCH debuted its Future of Play Direct showcase on June 12, 2021. It featured 22 titles from developers around the world. The games included were: 

 Raddminton
 Zodiac XX Leo Edition
 Killer Auto
 Umurangi Generation
 HyperDot
 Sephonie
 Anodyne 2: Return to Dust
 Spirit Swap
 The Wild at Heart
 Aerial_Knight's Never Yield
 Among Us
 Unbeatable
 Skullgirls
 Bravery Network Online
 Love Shore
 Hellbent
 Soup Pot
 Dome-King Cabbage
 Chinatown Detective Agency
 She Dreams Elsewhere
 Way To The Woods
 Bomb Rush Cyberfunk

References 

2021 in Los Angeles
2021 in video gaming
2021
June 2021 events in the United States